Andrew White may refer to:

Andrew White (Australian politician) (1859–1936)
Andrew White (basketball) (born 1993), American basketball player
Andrew White (Irish  cricketer) (born 1980), Irish cricketer, played for Northamptonshire and for Ireland
Andrew White (Jesuit) (1579–1656), Jesuit missionary
Andrew White (musician) (born 1974), of the Kaiser Chiefs
Andrew White (presenter) (born 1974), British television presenter
Andrew White (priest) (born 1964), Anglican priest known as the "Vicar of Baghdad"
Andrew White (rugby union) (1894–1968), New Zealand rugby union player
Andrew White (saxophonist) (1942–2020), jazz saxophonist and multi-instrumentalist
Andrew Dickson White (1832–1918), American diplomat, author and educator
Andrew G. White, Australian scientist and educator

See also
Andy White (disambiguation)
Andrew Wright (disambiguation)
Andrew Wight (1959–2012), Australian screenwriter and producer